Alena Krechyk (Belarusian: Алена Крэчык; born 20 July 1987) is a Belarusian athlete specialising in the hammer throw. She competed at the 2015 World Championships in Beijing without registering a valid mark.
 
Her personal best in the event is 72.06 metres set in Brest in 2015.

Competition record

See also
 Belarus at the 2015 World Championships in Athletics

References

1987 births
Living people
Belarusian female hammer throwers
Place of birth missing (living people)
World Athletics Championships athletes for Belarus